Dino Medjedović (born 13 June 1989) is an Bosnian footballer who plays as forward for Austrian OÖ Liga side SV Bad Schallerbach.

Club career 
Medjedović was born in Sarajevo, and came to Austria with his family. His football career began in the youth divisions of SK Admira Linz and LASK Linz. At 18, he joined the AGOVV Apeldoorn in Eerste Divisie the Dutch second division. In the Jupiler League, he played 20 games and scored a goal between 2007 and 2009. In the 2009–10 season, he played for MFK Karvina of Czech 2. Liga the second division in the Czech Republic. In 2010, he returned to Austria and joined the FC Blau-Weiß Linz from the Austrian Regional League Central.

2012 Medjedovic went to Germany and played for SC 07 Idar-Oberstein in the Regionalliga Südwest. He moved TSG Neustrelitz in the Regionalliga Nordost in 2013. He plays VfL Wolfsburg's second team in the Regionalliga Nord.

Career statistics 

1. Promotion rounds to 3. Liga.

References

External links
 Dino Medjedovic at Kicker
 
Austrian career stats - ÖFB

1989 births
Living people
Footballers from Sarajevo
Association football midfielders
Bosnia and Herzegovina footballers
Austrian footballers
AGOVV Apeldoorn players
MFK Karviná players
FC Blau-Weiß Linz players
TSG Neustrelitz players
VfL Wolfsburg II players
SC Paderborn 07 players
KF Shkëndija players
Aris Limassol FC players
FSV Wacker 90 Nordhausen players
ATSV Stadl-Paura players
Eerste Divisie players
Czech National Football League players
Austrian Regionalliga players
Regionalliga players
3. Liga players
Macedonian First Football League players
Cypriot First Division players
Bosnia and Herzegovina expatriate footballers
Expatriate footballers in the Netherlands
Bosnia and Herzegovina expatriate sportspeople in the Netherlands
Expatriate footballers in the Czech Republic
Bosnia and Herzegovina expatriate sportspeople in the Czech Republic
Expatriate footballers in Austria
Bosnia and Herzegovina expatriate sportspeople in Austria
Expatriate footballers in Germany
Bosnia and Herzegovina expatriate sportspeople in Germany
Expatriate footballers in North Macedonia
Bosnia and Herzegovina expatriate sportspeople in North Macedonia
Expatriate footballers in Cyprus
Bosnia and Herzegovina expatriate sportspeople in Cyprus